Syrian Telecom (officially: Syrian Telecommunications Establishment) is a telecommunications company in Syria.  The company is affiliated with the government of Syria. The twelve service providers in Syria run through two AS's, both of which are owned by Syrian Telecom (AS29256 and AS29386). Baker Baker has served as Director General and CEO for Syria Telecom for several years. Their partners include ST-Samsung of Korea, a technology solutions provider to Syria, Iraq, and Sudan. Since 2006, agreements for wireless systems such as the INTRACOM IAS-W have been acquired through international agreements with foreign hardware suppliers.

See also
Syriatel

References

External links
Syrian Telecom  

Telecommunications companies of Syria
Internet service providers of Syria
Government-owned companies of Syria
Companies based in Damascus
Syrian brands